Tomer Shem-Tov (born April 17, 1978) is a former Israeli footballer.

References

External links
 

1978 births
Living people
Israeli footballers
Hapoel Kfar Saba F.C. players
Maccabi Netanya F.C. players
Hapoel Ashkelon F.C. players
Footballers from Ra'anana
Israeli Premier League players
Israeli people of Afghan-Jewish descent
Association footballers not categorized by position